La Cienega Park (from the Spanish la ciénaga, meaning "the swamp") is a public park in Beverly Hills, California. 

The park includes three baseball diamonds, two soccer fields, a jogging track, a playground, multiple tennis courts, and a community center. The park is managed and administered by Beverly Hills.

The park covers area on both sides of La Cienega Boulevard, between Gregory Way and Shumacher Drive.

A California marker is at the park noting the spot of Portolá Trail Campsite No. 2 that was designated a California Historic Landmark (No.665) on Nov. 5, 1958.

External links 
La Cienega Park's official webpage at City of Beverly Hills website

Municipal parks in California
Parks in Beverly Hills, California